Qadchberuni was a region and family of the old Armenia  400–800. The ruler in about 451 was Nerseh Qadchberuni.

See also
List of regions of ancient Armenia

Early medieval Armenian regions